Eddie C. McGirt (January 31, 1920 – December 21, 1999) was an American football and basketball coach and college athletics administrator. He served as the head football coach at  Johnson C. Smith University in Charlotte, North Carolina from 1958 to 1977, compiling a record of 118–73–3. McGirt was also the head basketball coach at Johnson C. Smith from 1959 to 1962, tallying a mark of 63–32.

Early years
McGirt was born in Camden, South Carolina. He competed in football, basketball, and track at Mather Academy. He enrolled at Johnson C. Smith University in 1940, earning All-Central Intercollegiate Athletic Association (CIAA) honors as a fullback for the football team.

He entered the United States Army in 1943 and received a Purple Heart.

Coaching career
McGirt was the football head coach at Mather Academy for several years. In 1958, he returned to Johnson C. Smith University, where he eventually became the school's 11th head football coach.

He is credited with lifting Johnson C. Smith's struggling football team to become one of the CIAA's most respected. For 20 years, his teams ranked at the top of CIAA standings. He retired after 20 years as Johnson C. Smith's head football coach. During his tenure, his teams won one CIAA championship (1969), two divisional titles, and were runners-up twice. He retired with an overall football coaching record of 118-73.

He also served many teaching positions and coached the university's basketball team from 1959 to 1962 with an overall record of 63–32.

McGirt remained as the university's athletic director and head of the Department of Health and Physical Education until June 30, 1985. He supported Johnson C. Smith athletics until his death on December 21, 1999.

In 1977, he was inducted into the Central Intercollegiate Athletic Association (CIAA) Hall of Fame. The university's football field is named after him (Eddie McGirt Field). The Eddie C. McGirt Endowed Scholarship is awarded to a sophomore, junior, or student athlete with at least a 3.0 GPA.

Head coaching record

Football

References

External links
 Honoree South Carolina African American History Online

1920 births
1999 deaths
American football fullbacks
Basketball coaches from South Carolina
Johnson C. Smith Golden Bulls and Lady Golden Bulls athletic directors
Johnson C. Smith Golden Bulls basketball coaches
Johnson C. Smith Golden Bulls football coaches
Johnson C. Smith Golden Bulls football players
High school football coaches in South Carolina
Columbia University alumni
United States Army personnel of World War II
People from Camden, South Carolina
Players of American football from South Carolina
African-American coaches of American football
African-American players of American football
African-American basketball coaches
African-American college athletic directors in the United States
20th-century African-American sportspeople